Scott Macartney (born January 19, 1978) is a retired American World Cup alpine ski racer. He concentrated in the speed events of downhill and super-G.

Biography
Born in Seattle, Washington, Macartney was raised in suburban Redmond, where his parents were public school teachers. Macartney did not attend a ski academy, but graduated from Redmond High School in 1996 while working his way up through regional teams in the Northwest with limited funding. He attended Dartmouth College in Hanover, New Hampshire, where he earned a bachelor's degree in economics.

Macartney competed at the 2002 Winter Olympics in Salt Lake City and was the first racer on the course in the downhill event at Snowbasin, and finished 29th. He attained his first World Cup podium on January 29, 2006, when he placed second at the Super-G in Garmisch-Partenkirchen, Germany.

A few weeks later, he competed in the 2006 Winter Olympics in Torino, where he finished 16th in the men's combined,15th in the downhill and 7th in the super-G at Sestriere.

Injury at Kitzbühel
On his 30th birthday in 2008, Macartney competed in the Hahnenkamm downhill in Kitzbühel, Austria. The second racer on the course, he had an excellent run going until he suffered a spectacular fall just five seconds from the finish line. At the final jump (Zielsprung), he was twisted left while airborne, could not recover, and crashed whilst finishing the race. He was airlifted by helicopter to a hospital in Innsbruck, said to have suffered bruising to the brain, and was put into an induced coma. He regained consciousness the next day. As Macartney did not miss a gate, he finished the race in 33rd place with a time of 1:55.91, 3.16 seconds behind the winner, Didier Cuche.

Macartney recovered from his injuries and was named to the top team ("A Team") of the U.S. Ski Team for the 2008-09 World Cup season.

World Cup results

Season standings

Top Ten finishes
 2 podiums – (1 DH, 1 SG)

World Championship results

Olympic results

References

Further reading

External links
 
 Scott Macartney World Cup standings at the International Ski Federation 
 
 
 Scott Macartney personal website

American male alpine skiers
Alpine skiers at the 2002 Winter Olympics
Alpine skiers at the 2006 Winter Olympics
Olympic alpine skiers of the United States
Living people
1978 births
Sportspeople from Redmond, Washington